The South Australian Football Association (SAFA) was a semi-professional Australian rules football competition based in Adelaide, South Australia from 1978 to the end of the 1995 season.

Member Clubs

Premierships

A1 (John Stevens Perpetual Trophy) 
1978 Flinders Park 
1979 Flinders Park
1980 Edwardstown
1981 Flinders Park
1982 Edwardstown
1983 Flinders Park
1984 Pooraka 
1985 Pooraka
1986 Payneham  
1987 Edwardstown
1988 Edwardstown
1989 Pooraka
1990 Pooraka
1991 Pooraka
1992 Henley District and Old Scholars
1993 Henley District and Old Scholars
1994 Pooraka
1995 Athelstone

A2 
1978 Modbury 
1979 Port District 
1980 Payneham  
1981 Mount Lofty District 
1982 Gepps Cross 
1983 Henley District and Old Scholars 
1984 Ingle Farm 
1985 Modbury
1986 Elizabeth
1987 Norwood Districts
1988 
1989 
1990 
1991 
1992 
1993 
1994 Edwardstown
1995 Athelstone

A3 
1978 Edwardstown 
1979 Edwardstown
1980 Edwardstown
1981 Edwardstown
1982 Edwardstown
1983 Flinders Park
1984 Edwardstown
1985 Flinders Park
1986 Flinders Park
1987 Henley District and Old Scholars
1988 Mitchell Park 
1989 Brighton 
1990 Mitchell Park
1991 Edwardstown
1992 Para Hills 
1993 Henley District and Old Scholars
1994 Pooraka
1995 Athelstone

A4 
1978 Athelstone
1979 Athelstone
1980 Walkerville 
1981 Athelstone
1982 Athelstone
1983 Flinders Park
1984 Henley District and Old Scholars
1985 Elizabeth 
1986 Elizabeth
1987 Henley District and Old Scholars
1988 Walkerville
1989 Edwardstown
1990 Plympton 
1991 Edwardstown
1992 Salisbury North 
1993 Athelstone
1994 Plympton
1995 Athelstone

Medallists

A1 - Harford Medal 
1980 - Peter Munn (Ferryden Park)
1982 - John Eldridge (Ferryden Park)
1983 - Peter Munn (Ferryden Park)
1985 - Peter King (Athelstone)
1986 - Adrian Rocco (Athelstone)
1987 - Tim Valente (Athelstone)
1988 - Randall Wright (Brighton)
1989 - Gary Simpson (Pooraka)
1991 - Andrew Horsnell (Henley District and Old Scholars) 
1992 - Matthew Wormald (Henley District and Old Scholars)
1993 - Errol Surman (Athelstone)
1994 - Chris Grigg (Athelstone)

A2 - Ardill Medal 
1983 - Ian Berry (Henley District and Old Scholars)

Figallo Medal  
Awarded for Best on Ground in an A1 Grand Final
1989 - Barclay Mathews (Pooraka)
1990 - Gary Simpson (Pooraka)
1991 - Gary Simpson (Pooraka)

References 

Defunct Australian rules football competitions in South Australia
1995 disestablishments in Australia